Joseph-Paul Strebler (12 September 1892, Mertzwiller – 12 March 1984, Saint-Pierre) was a French Roman Catholic bishop and missionary. He was ordained as a Priest of the Society of African Missions on 10 July 1921. He was assigned to Togo in 1937, appointed Prefect of Sokodé on 24 July 1937. He became Archbishop of Lomé on 14 September 1955, a position which he served until 16 June 1961. On 16 June 1961 he was appointed Titular Archbishop of Nicopolis in Epirus, a position he held until his resignation on 11 June 1971.

References

1892 births
1984 deaths
People from Bas-Rhin
People from Alsace-Lorraine
French Roman Catholic bishops in Togo
Togolese Roman Catholic bishops
French Roman Catholic missionaries
Roman Catholic archbishops of Lomé
Roman Catholic missionaries in Greece
French expatriates in Togo
French expatriates in Greece
20th-century Roman Catholic archbishops in Africa
Roman Catholic bishops of Lomé